"It's About Time" is a song by American rock band the Beach Boys from their 1970 album Sunflower. Written by Dennis Wilson, Al Jardine, Bob Burchman and Carl Wilson, it was issued as the B-side of the "Tears in the Morning" single. Jardine said, "'It's About Time' was Carl, Dennis and I. That's a good one. I like that production. That was mostly Dennis, and I just helped with the lyrics. Dennis and Carl did the track."

Reception
Biographer Timothy White wrote:

Reviewing the song for AllMusic, Matthew Greenwald wrote:

Personnel
Sourced from Craig Slowinski.
The Beach Boys
 Al Jardine – backing vocals, rhythm guitar
 Mike Love – lead vocals (bridge), backing vocals
 Carl Wilson – lead and backing vocals, lead guitars, production
 Dennis Wilson – backing vocals, production
 Bruce Johnston – backing vocals
Additional musicians and production staff
 Daryl Dragon – tack piano; organ (uncertain)
 Jimmy Bond – double bass, electric bass
 Earl Palmer – drums
 Dennis Dragon – congas, cowbells, timbales
 Stephen Desper – engineer

References

External links
 The Forgotten Song That Made The Beach Boys Cool Again

The Beach Boys songs
Songs written by Al Jardine
Songs written by Dennis Wilson
1970 songs
Song recordings produced by the Beach Boys
Reprise Records singles
1970 singles